Boys Life 3 is a compilation of five short films that deal with coming-out and the trials and tribulations of being gay in America.

Premises
Inside Out (1996, directed by Jason Gould; starring Alexis Arquette and Elliott Gould)
Just One Time (1998, directed by Lane Janger; starring Guillermo Díaz, Jennifer Esposito, Joelle Carter): A man wants his girlfriend to have a sexual relationship with another girl, just one time.
Hitch (2000, directed by Bradley Rust Gray, starring Jason Herman, Drew Wood): Two friends on a road-trip: one is gay, the other straight. The former gets attracted to the latter.
Majorettes in Space (French: Des majorettes dans l'espace, 1996, directed by David Fourier, starring Elise Laurent, Jean-Marc Delacruz, Olivier Laville): Two male Russian cosmonauts, one of whom has a fetish for majorettes, are in space without condoms. A young heterosexual couple have sex outdoors. Pope John Paul II is passionate about airports but enforces the sexually restrictive teachings of the Catholic Church. Vincent, a young gay man, is dying of AIDS.
$30 (1999, directed by Gregory Cooke, starring Sara Gilbert, Erik MacArthur, Gregory Itzin): A father buys his closeted son a night with a prostitute.

See also
 List of American films of 2000
 Boys Life
 Boys Life 2
 Boys Life 4: Four Play

References

External links 
 

2000 films
2000 drama films
2000 LGBT-related films
American LGBT-related films
French LGBT-related films
Boys Life films
American anthology films
French anthology films
Films with screenplays by Christopher B. Landon
2000s English-language films
2000s American films
2000s French films